Vladimir Konstantinovich Vitkovsky (April 21, 1885 – January 18, 1978) was a White Army general in the Russian Civil War.

He was born in Pskov. He served in the Imperial Russian Army in World War I. He was a recipient of the Order of St. George, the Order of St. Vladimir, the Order of St. Anna and the Order of Saint Stanislaus.

In early 1918 Vitkovsky joined the special Russian volunteer brigade under the command of Colonel Mikhail Drozdovsky and took part in the Iași–Don March. In the Volunteer Army he participated in the Second Kuban Campaign and in June 1918 he commanded a battalion and then the 2nd regiment, replacing Colonel Mikhail Jebrak, who had fallen in battle. In November he commanded a brigade of the 3rd Division and was promoted to Major-General in December 1918.

In February 1919 Vitkovsky was appointed head of the 3rd Drozdovski Division, with which he participated in the Advance on Moscow and the retreat towards Novorossiisk. In April 1920 he became Lieutenant-General and received the Order of Saint Nicholas Thaumaturgus for his actions in the Northern Taurida Operation.

After the defeat of the White movement, he evacuated to Turkey in November 1920 with fellow general Pyotr Nikolayevich Wrangel. After staying briefly in Bulgaria (1921–1922), he went to Paris, France, where he was a member of the Russian All-Military Union. After World War II, he emigrated to the United States. He died in San Francisco, California.

Compositions
 Константинопольский поход: из воспоминаний о Галлиполи. Париж, 1933.
 В борьбе за Россию: воспоминания. Сан-Франциско, 1963.

References

External links
 Биография
 Биография
 Воспоминания генерала Врангеля
 Лобыцин В. Русская армия в Галлиполи
 Фотография штаба 1-й пех. дивизии в Галлиполи
 Уникальные документы и фотографии генерала Витковского В. К.
 

1885 births
1978 deaths
Recipients of the Order of St. Vladimir, 3rd class
Recipients of the Order of St. Vladimir, 4th class
Recipients of the Order of St. Anna, 2nd class
Recipients of the Order of Saint Stanislaus (Russian), 2nd class
Recipients of the Order of St. Anna, 3rd class
Recipients of the Order of Saint Stanislaus (Russian), 3rd class
Recipients of the Order of St. Anna, 4th class
Russian military personnel of World War I
White movement generals
Imperial Russian Army personnel